Izi (also Romanized as Īzī; also known as Qal‘eh-ye Īzī and Deh Benām) is a village in Qasabeh-ye Sharqi Rural District, in the Central District of Sabzevar County, Razavi Khorasan Province, Iran. At the 2006 census, its population was 2,132, in 624 families.

References 

Populated places in Sabzevar County